Yaccarino is a surname. Notable people with the surname include:

Dan Yaccarino (born 1965), American author, illustrator, and animated series producer
Dave Yaccarino (born 1958), American politician